The Mauritius lowland forest day gecko (Phelsuma guimbeaui), also known commonly as the orange-spotted day gecko,  is a diurnal species of gecko, a lizard in the family Gekkonidae. The species is native to the western coast of Mauritius and typically inhabits large trees. The Mauritius lowland forest day gecko feeds on insects and nectar.

Etymology
The specific name, guimbeaui, is in honor of the collector of the holotype, "Mr. Bernard Guimbeau".

Description
P. guimbeaui belongs to the mid-sized genus Phelsuma. Females are only . The Mauritius lowland forest day gecko has a short, compact body form. The dorsal body colour is a brilliant green with a diffuse blue area on the neck region. There are irregular shaped orange-red bars and spots on the back and tail, the tip of which may be blue. The ventral side is whitish-yellow. One or two brown v-shaped bars are present on the chin. Juveniles are greyish-brown with little white spots, and start changing colour after six months. After 12–15 months, they have the adult appearance.

Geographic range
P. guimbeaui inhabits the western side of Mauritius. It occurs at low and mid elevation. Populations can be found at the villages of Chamarel, Yemen, Tamarin and Grande Rivière Noire. P. guimbeaui is also established on the Hawaiian island of Oahu.

Habitat
The Mauritius lowland forest day gecko prefers large trees such as palms and acacia species. P. guimbeaui is only rarely seen near human dwellings. It lives in the drier and warmer part of Mauritius. Much of the lowland forest of Mauritius, which is the original habitat of P. guimbeaui,  has been cleared to make way for sugar cane plantations. P. guimbeaui sometimes shares its habitat with P. cepediana and P. ornata.

Diet
The Mauritius lowland forest day gecko feeds on various insects and other invertebrates. It also likes to lick soft, sweet fruit, pollen and nectar.

Behaviour
The Mauritius lowland forest day gecko is rather shy because it is heavily predated by different bird species.

Reproduction
In P. guimbeaui the pairing season is between March and the first weeks of September. During this period, the females lay up to 6 pairs of eggs. The young will hatch after approximately 60–90 days. The juveniles measure . The Mauritius lowland forest day gecko is an egg gluer and often a colony nester. It often lays its eggs in tree holes. Juveniles reach pubescence after 18–20 months.

Threats
P. guimbeaui has been evaluated by the IUCN as "endangered". Its habitat is small and fragmented. Moreover, 12 of 19 endemic reptile species from mainland Mauritius are extinct. It is traded commercially as a terrarium pet and this may be a threat; little is known about trade in Phelsuma species. Phelsuma are all CITES Appendix II listed.

Care and maintenance in captivity
P. guimbeaui should be housed in pairs in a large, well planted terrarium. The daytime temperature should be between 29 and 32 °C (84 and 90 °F). During the night, the temperature should drop to approximately 20 °C (68 °F). The humidity should be maintained between 60 and 70%. In captivity, P. guimbeaui can be fed with crickets, commercial fructivorous gecko diets, wax moths, fruits flies, mealworms, and houseflies.

Sources
Henkel, Friedrich-Wilhelm; Schmidt, Wolfgang (1995) Amphibien und Reptilien Madagaskars, der Maskarenen, Seychellen und Komoren. Stuttgart: Ulmer. 311 pp. . (in German).
McKeown, Sean (1993). The General Care and Maintenance of Day Geckos. Lakeside, California: Advanced Vivarium Systems.

References

Further reading
Mertens R (1963). "The geckos of the genus Phelsuma on Mauritius and adjacent islands". Mauritius Institute Bulletin 5: 299-305. (Phelsuma guimbeaui, new species).

guimbeaui guimbeaui
Reptiles of Mauritius
Endemic fauna of Mauritius
Taxa named by Robert Mertens
Reptiles described in 1963
Species endangered by the pet trade
Reptiles as pets